Domaniów  is a village in Oława County, Lower Silesian Voivodeship, in south-western Poland. It is the seat of the administrative district (gmina) called Gmina Domaniów.

References

Villages in Oława County